Nymphicula mesorphna is a moth in the family Crambidae. It was described by Edward Meyrick in 1894. It is found in Myanmar, Japan and Taiwan.

The length of the forewings is 4.9-5.3 mm for males and 5.5-5.6 mm for females. The forewings are pale orange, but fuscous from the base to the white antemedial band and mixed with pale orange scales proximally. The hindwings are white from the base to the antemedial band and partly scattered with dark brown scales. The antemedial band is white. The area between the antemedial band and the medial area is pale orange, mixed with fuscous scales on the anterior portion.

References

Nymphicula
Moths described in 1894